Kadima is a 21st-century political party in Israel.

Kadima or Kadimah may also refer to:

 Kadima (game) or matkot, an Israeli paddle game
 Kadimah (student association), a 19th-century proto-Zionist student association
 Kadima (youth group), a youth group affiliated with the United Synagogue of Conservative Judaism (USCJ)
 A village in Israel, now part of Kadima-Zoran

See also
 , a parish in Cantanhede, Portugal